The 2018–19 PFC CSKA Moscow season was the 27th successive season that the club play in the Russian Premier League, the highest tier of association football in Russia.

Season events
On 5 June, Georgi Shchennikov signed a new contract with CSKA until the summer of 2023.
On 14 June, CSKA announced that Konstantin Bazelyuk would spend the 2018–19 season on loan at FC SKA-Khabarovsk.

On 15 June it was confirmed that CSKA would take FC Tosno's place in the Russian Super Cup on 27 July.

On 20 June, CSKA Moscow announced that they had agreed the transfer of Hörður Magnússon with Bristol City, with personal terms still to be signed, whilst Bristol City announced that Magnússon had left for an undisclosed fee. Two days later, 22 June, CSKA announced the signing of Jaka Bijol on a five-year contract from Rudar Velenje.

On 2 July, Sergei Tkachyov moved to Arsenal Tula on a season-long loan deal.

On 4 July, CSKA Moscow announced the signing of Rodrigo Becão on a season-long loan deal from Bahia.

On 8 July, Sergei Ignashevich announced his retirement from football, with Aleksei Berezutski and Vasili Berezutski also announcing their retirement from football on 20 July.

On 18 July, Kirill Nababkin extended his contract with CSKA Moscow until the end of the 2019/20 season, with manager Viktor Goncharenko also extending his contract the following day, until the end of the 2019/20 season.

On 26 July, CSKA Moscow announced the signing of Ilzat Akhmetov on a four-year contract after his Rubin Kazan contract had expired.

On 27 July, CSKA Moscow announced that Aleksandr Golovin had signed for AS Monaco on a record-breaking transfer fee for CSKA Moscow. Later the same day, CSKA Moscow won their seventh Russian Super Cup, with a 1-0 extra time victory over Lokomotiv Moscow. After the game, CSKA Moscow confirmed that Vitinho had left the club to join Flamengo.

On 1 August, CSKA Moscow announced the arrival of Abel Hernández from Hull City on a three-year contract.

On 14 August, CSKA Moscow announced that Aaron Olanare had left the club after his contract with cancelled by mutual consent. The following day, 15 August, CSKA Moscow announced the arrival of Nikola Vlašić on a season-long loan deal from Everton

On 30 August, Igor Akinfeev signed a new contract with CSKA until the summer of 2022.

On 31 August, CSKA Moscow announced that Arnór Sigurðsson had signed on a five-year contract from IFK Norrköping, that Takuma Nishimura had signed on a four-year contract from Vegalta Sendai, and Ivan Oblyakov had signed from FC Ufa until the summer of 2023.

On 5 October, CSKA Moscow announced the signing of Malian striker Lassana N'Diaye, on a contract until the summer of 2023, after he turned 18 on 3 October.

On 18 December, CSKA Moscow announced that goalkeeper Pavel Ovchinnikov and defender Ivan Maklakov had left the club at the expiration of their contracts.

On 9 January 2019, Nayair Tiknizyan and Vitaly Zhironkin both signed a new contracts with the CSKA until the summer of 2022. On 22 January, CSKA Moscow announced that Fyodor Chalov had signed a new contract with the club, until the summer of 2022.

On 24 January, Timur Zhamaletdinov joined Lech Poznań on loan until the end of the season, with an option for Lech Poznań to make the move permanent at the end of the season. The following day Khetag Khosonov joined Tambov on loan until the end of the season, whilst Astemir Gordyushenko joined Tyumen on loan until the end of the season.

On 11 February, Timur Pukhov left CSKA Moscow to join Lithuanian club FK Žalgiris. On 19 February, Aleksandr Makarov moved on loan to Avangard Kursk for the remainder of the season, whilst Maksim Yedapin joined Yenisey Krasnoyarsk on a similar deal.

On 22 February, CSKA Moscow announced that Ivan Oleynikov had joined Fakel Voronezh on loan until the end of the season, whilst Igor Diveyev had joined the club on loan until the end of the season from Ufa, with an option to make the move permanent in the summer.

On 26 April, Viktor Vasin signed a new contract with CSKA, keeping him at the club until the summer of 2021.

On 31 May, CSKA Moscow announced that they had exercised their option to make Igor Diveyev's loan deal permanent, signing him to a five-year contract, whilst Anatoli Anisimov left the club after the expiration of his contract.

Squad

Out on loan

Transfers

In

Out

Loans in

Loans out

Released

Friendlies

Competitions

Super Cup

Premier League

Results by round

Results

League table

Russian Cup

UEFA Champions League

Group stage

Squad statistics

Appearances and goals

|-
|colspan="14"|Players away from the club on loan:

|-
|colspan="14"|Players who left CSKA Moscow during the season:

|}

Goal Scorers

Disciplinary record

References

PFC CSKA Moscow seasons
CSKA Moscow
CSKA Moscow